Billy Martin (born December 25, 1956) is a former professional tennis player from the United States. During his career, he won the NCAA Singles Title in 1975, defeating George Hardie, and one singles title and three doubles titles on the Pro Tour. He achieved a career-high singles ranking of world No. 32 in 1975. Martin currently serves as the head coach for the UCLA Bruins men's tennis team, a position he has held since 1994. Martin, who played at UCLA, has 14 straight top 5 NCAA team finishes and 9 consecutive 20-win seasons. He was named ITA (Intercollegiate Tennis Association) division 1 National Coach of the Year and is a member of ITA Hall of Fame.
He beat Raul Ramirez and Stan Smith at the Washington D.C. tournament.

Career finals

Singles (1 title, 1 runner-up)

Doubles (3 titles, 4 runner-ups)

References

External links
 
 

American male tennis players
French Open champions
Sportspeople from Evanston, Illinois
Tennis people from Illinois
UCLA Bruins men's tennis players
US Open (tennis) junior champions
Wimbledon junior champions
1956 births
Living people
Grand Slam (tennis) champions in mixed doubles
UCLA Bruins men's tennis coaches
Grand Slam (tennis) champions in boys' singles
American tennis coaches